O to Be a Dragon is a 1959 poetry collection by the American poet Marianne Moore, and the title of the collection's eponymous poem. It was published by Viking Press in New York City.

It was not initially published by Faber and Faber in England as Faber's editor TS Eliot considered it too short, but it was later combined with four extra poems and a collection that had not previously appeared in the United Kingdom, and issued as The Arctic fox in 1964.

TIME magazine's review of O to Be a Dragon included directions to Moore's apartment which led to her being in her own words "obliterated by trespassers..I might say thugs! Letters upon letters also."

Poems
"O to Be a Dragon"
"I May, I Might, I Must"
"To a Chameleon"
"A Jelly-Fish"
"Values in Use"
"Hometown Piece for Messrs. Alton and Reese"
"Enough: Jamestown, 1607-1957"
"Melchior Vulpis"
"No Better Than a "Withered Daffodil""
"In the Public Garden"
"The Arctic Ox (or Goat)"
"Saint Nicholas"
"For February 14th"
"Combat Cultural"
"Leonardo da Vinci's"

References

1959 books
American poetry collections
Poetry by Marianne Moore